Trista let tomu... is a 1956 Soviet historical drama film directed by Vladimir Petrov and starring Sergey Dvoretskiy, Vasiliy Lanovoy and Natalya Uzhviy.

Cast
 Sergey Dvoretskiy - Andrey Zhurba 
 Vasiliy Lanovoy - 
 Natalya Uzhviy -

External links

1956 films
1950s historical films
Soviet historical films
1950s Russian-language films
Films set in the 1640s
Films set in the 1650s
Films directed by Vladimir Petrov
Stoll Pictures films
Soviet black-and-white films